The 2018 Baltic Cup was the 27th Baltic Cup, an international football tournament contested by the Baltic states. The tournament was held between 30 May and 5 June 2018. Latvia won their 13th title.

Standings

Matches

Estonia vs Lithuania

Latvia vs Estonia

Lithuania vs Latvia

Winners

Statistics

Goalscorers

References

2018
2018 in Estonian football
2018 in Latvian football
2018 in Lithuanian football
May 2018 sports events in Europe
June 2018 sports events in Europe